Sowemimo Abiodun Alex (born 25 December 1986) is a Nigerian internet entrepreneur who founded PageOmni. In March 2019, he was given the "Most Promising Youth Award" by the Egyptian president Abdel Fattah El-Sisi at the World Youth Forum. He is the president of Africa Emerging Generation of Innovators.

References

1986 births
Living people
Nigerian company founders